John Oldham (9 August 1653 – 9 December 1683) was an English satirical poet and translator.

Life and work
Oldham was born in Shipton Moyne, Gloucestershire, the son of John Oldham, a non-conformist minister, and grandson of John Oldham the staunch anti-papist rector of Shipton Moyne and before that of Long Newton in Wiltshire. He was educated first at Tetbury Grammar School, then at St. Edmund Hall at the University of Oxford, where the Principal was Thomas Tully, an ex-headmaster from Oldham's school at Tetbury. Tully was "a person of severe morals, puritanically inclined and a struict Calvinist.

Oldham received a B. A. degree in May 1674. He became an usher at the Whitgift School in Croydon, Surrey (now in Greater London), a position that was poorly paid, monotonous and left little time for him to compose poetry; his discontent at the time was expressed in these lines from one of his satires - "To a friend about to leave University":

"But who would be to the vile drudgery bound
Where there so small encouragement is found?
Where you for recompense for all your pains,
Shall hardly reach a common fiddler's gains?
For when you've toiled and laboured all you can,
To dung and cultivate a barren brain,
A Dancing-Master shall be better paid,
Tho' he instructs the Heels and you the Head." 

By then his poetry had already been published, and he received an unexpected visit at the school from an illustrious party including the Earl of Rochester, Charles Sedley and the Earl of Dorset (part of the "merry gang", as Andrew Marvell called them), who wished to express their appreciation of his work.

He left the Whitgift school in 1678 and took up the post of tutor to the grandsons of a retired Judge, Sir Edward Thurland, in the vicinity of Reigate in Surrey. It was during this period that he composed and had published his satires against the Jesuits, at a time when popular anger was being stirred up against Catholics in England by the "Popish plot". In 1680, he became, for a short time, tutor to the son of Sir William Hicks, through whom he made the acquaintance of the notable physician Dr. Richard Lower. Under his influence he took up the study of medicine for a year before returning to his poetic muse.

Oldham settled in London and was introduced to John Dryden, with whom he became close friends. He entered fashionable society (said to be centred on Will's Coffee House), and was approached by the Earl of Kingston-upon-Hull to be a private chaplain to his household. Oldham turned down the post but did accept the hospitality of the Earl at his seat at Holme Pierrepont Hall in Nottinghamshire.

It was here that he died of smallpox, on 9 December 1683, aged only 30. He may also have suffered from tuberculosis during his lifetime. The Earl of Kingston-upon-Hull had a monument, possibly designed by Grinling Gibbons, erected over Oldham's grave in St. Edmund's Church in Holme Pierrepont. John Dryden wrote an elegy on his death.

Oldham was a satirist who imitated the classical Satires of Juvenal. His best-known works are A Satire Upon a Woman Who by Her Falsehood and Scorn Was the Death of My Friend, written in 1678 and A Satire against Virtue, written in 1679. During his lifetime, his poetry was published anonymously. His translations of Juvenal were published after his death.

John Dryden was one of Oldham's admirers and upon his death Dryden expressed his admiration in "To the Memory of Mr. Oldham".

Style
Although regarded as a vigorous and passionate satirist, Oldham is often regarded as having been hampered by a poor ear for rhyme and rhythm. As Robinson (1980) has pointed out, however, "Oldham chose the rugged style of most of his satires: it was not imposed upon him by incapacity or carelessness."

Notes

Bibliography
Thompson, Edward. The compositions in verse and prose of Mr. John Oldham, to which are added memoirs of his life (in 3 vols, 1770). 
Cibber, Theophilus. The Lives of the Poets of Great Britain and Ireland : to the time of Dean Swift (Volume 2) (1753) pp. 337–343.
Bell, Robert (Ed). The poems of John Oldham (London, Charles Griffin, 1871).

External links

1653 births
1684 deaths
Deaths from smallpox
17th-century English poets
17th-century English male writers
English satirists
People from Cotswold District
Alumni of the University of Oxford
Infectious disease deaths in England
English male poets
Tory poets